Roger Michael Harper is a former professional American football safety in the National Football League (NFL) for the Atlanta Falcons and Dallas Cowboys. He also was a member of the BC Lions in the Canadian Football League (CFL). He played college football at Ohio State University.

Early years
Harper attended Independence High School. As a senior wingback, he gained over 1,600 yards in total offense with an average of 16.5 yards-per-reception. He received All-Ohio honors and was awarded the James A. Rhodes Trophy.

He was also an All-state basketball player.

College career
He accepted a football scholarship from Ohio State University. He became a starter as a sophomore, tying for the team lead with 3 interceptions, including returning a Drew Bledsoe pass for a 42-yard touchdown against Washington State University.

As a junior, he led the team with 4 interceptions. At the end of the season, he declared his intention to enter the NFL Draft. He finished his college career with 118 tackles (75 solo) and 7 interceptions.

Professional career

Atlanta Falcons
Harper was selected by the Atlanta Falcons in the second round (38th overall) of the 1993 NFL Draft. As a rookie, he was named the starter at strong safety in the fourth game against the Pittsburgh Steelers. He posted 112 defensive tackles (fifth on the team), 5 quarterback pressures, 2 passes defensed, 15 special teams tackles (fourth on the team) and was named to the NFL's All-rookie team.

In 1994, he was moved to free safety and suffered a fractured right forearm against the New Orleans Saints, causing him to miss the last 6 games. He collected 57 tackles, 3 quarterback pressures, 3 passes defensed and one interception.

In 1995, he started the first 12 games at free safety, recording 77 tackles, 2 quarterback pressures, one interception and one forced fumble. On April 18, 1996, he was traded to the Dallas Cowboys in exchange for a fourth (#127-Juran Bolden) and a fifth round draft choice (#164-Gary Bandy).

Dallas Cowboys
Harper missed the first 2 games of the 1996 season with a fracture in his right forearm, that he suffered during the Blue-White scrimmage in training camp. After safety George Teague was signed in the preseason, he was used mostly on the nickel defense, posting 33 defensive tackles, 5 passes defensed, one forced fumble and 11 special teams tackles. He was released on August 17, 1997.

Green Bay Packers
On February 23, 1998, Harper was signed as a free agent by the Green Bay Packers. He was released on May 4.

BC Lions
In 1999, he signed with the BC Lions of the Canadian Football League.

References

1970 births
Living people
Players of Canadian football from Columbus, Ohio
Players of American football from Columbus, Ohio
American football safeties
Ohio State Buckeyes football players
Atlanta Falcons players
Dallas Cowboys players
BC Lions players